Agsiazan (also, Agsiazan’ and Agsiyazan’) is a village in the Khizi Rayon of Azerbaijan.

References 

Populated places in Khizi District